Systena is a genus of flea beetles in the family Chrysomelidae. There are about 90 described species, found in the New World, mostly in the Neotropics.

Selected species

 Systena bitaeniata (J. L. LeConte, 1859)
 Systena blanda F. E. Melsheimer, 1847 (palestriped flea beetle)
 Systena californica Blake, 1935
 Systena carri Blake, 1935
 Systena collaris Crotch, 1873
 Systena corni Schaeffer, 1932 (dogwood systena)
 Systena dimorpha Blake, 1933
 Systena elongata (Fabricius, 1798) (elongate flea beetle)
 Systena frontalis (Fabricius, 1801) (red-headed flea beetle)
 Systena gracilenta Blake, 1933
 Systena hudsonias (Forster, 1771) (black-headed flea beetle)
 Systena laevis Blake, 1935
 Systena laurentia Bechyné, 1955
 Systena lherminieri Bryant, 1942
 Systena marginalis (Illiger, 1807) (margined systena)
 Systena mitis (J. L. LeConte, 1858)
 Systena pallicornis Schaeffer, 1906
 Systena pallipes Schwarz, 1878
 Systena plicata Blatchley, 1921
 Systena sexnotata Fall, 1910
 Systena s-littera (Linnaeus, 1758)
 Systena variata Schaeffer, 1932

References

Further reading

External links

 

Alticini
Chrysomelidae genera
Articles created by Qbugbot
Taxa named by Louis Alexandre Auguste Chevrolat